The neokaryotes (Cavalier-Smith 1993) are a proposed eukaryote clade consisting of the unikonts and the bikonts as sister of for instance the Jakobea. It arises because the Euglenozoa, Percolozoa, Tsukubea, and Jakobea are seen in this view as more basal eukaryotes. These four groups, are traditionally grouped together in the Discoba. However, the Discoba may well be paraphyletic as the neokaryotes may have emerged in them.

Taxonomy 
A proposed cladogram is

References 

 
Eukaryote unranked clades